Bellevue is a city in the Eastside region of King County, Washington, United States, located across Lake Washington from Seattle. It is the third-largest city in the Seattle metropolitan area and has variously been characterized as a satellite city, a suburb, a boomburb, or an edge city. Its population was 122,363 at the 2010 census and 151,854 in the 2020 census. The city's name is derived from the French term  ("beautiful view").

Bellevue is home to some of the world's largest technology companies. Before and after the 2008 recession, its downtown area has been undergoing rapid change with many high-rise projects being constructed. Downtown Bellevue is currently the second-largest city center in Washington state, with 1,300 businesses, 45,000 employees, and 10,200 residents. In a 2018 estimate, the city's median household income was among the top five cities in the state of Washington.
In 2008, Bellevue was number one in CNNMoney's list of the best places to live and launch a business, and in 2010 was again ranked as the fourth-best place to live in America. In 2014, Bellevue was ranked as the second-best place to live by USA Today.

More than 145 companies have been located in Bellevue; companies currently headquartered there include PACCAR Inc, T-Mobile, and Valve. The technology company Amazon was founded in Bellevue by Jeff Bezos.

History
The Duwamish, whose main settlements were located in present-day Renton and Seattle, maintained a small outpost settlement called Satskal (SAH-tsah-kahl) along the Mercer Slough, south of present-day downtown Bellevue. It was from this village that an attack on the settlers of Elliott Bay was staged. The Duwamish also had a village near Factoria called 'pah-pah-DEEL'.

Bellevue was first settled by European Americans in 1869 by William Meydenbauer and Aaron Mercer, who claimed homestead tracts several miles apart. Both moved away within a few years, and permanent residents did not arrive until 1879. By 1882, a community, consisting mostly of logging homesteaders, had established itself. Once the land had been logged, it was gradually cleared, largely by Japanese immigrant labor in the early 20th century, to support small-scale farming on leased land plots.

By the early part of the 20th century, Bellevue had acquired a reputation as a weekend getaway destination for Seattle residents, who would arrive by ferry at Meydenbauer Bay and spend the day at nearby Wildwood Park. After the ferry landing was moved to Medina, however, tourism to Bellevue waned. To counter this decline, the Bellevue Strawberry Festival was conceived of in 1925, and by the 1930s it had grown to attract as many as 15,000 visitors. At the time, Bellevue was still a small town with around 2,000 residents.

Prior to the opening of the Lake Washington Floating Bridge in 1940, Bellevue was mostly rural farmland area with little development. Although it was small, developers were pushing to change that; in the 1920s, James S. Ditty predicted that it would become a city with a population of 200,000. He envisioned plans that included the bridging of Lake Washington and an area filled with golf courses and airports. His map with these visions was published in 1928. Once the Murrow Memorial Bridge opened, access from Seattle improved, and the area began to evolve into a bedroom community.

In 1942, the Bellevue Strawberry Festival was cancelled. The primary reason was that some 90 percent of the agricultural workforce in the area was of Japanese ancestry, and all of these farmers and their families had been forcibly interned in camps following the start of World War II. The fair would not be revived for another 45 years. Following the expulsion of the ethnic Japanese farming community, a large quantity of farmland became available for development. This made way for the initial development of the Bellevue downtown area.

Bellevue incorporated as a third-class city on the March 31, 1953. Following the 1963 opening of a second bridge across the lake, the Evergreen Point Floating Bridge, the city began to grow more rapidly. The Crossroads community was annexed in 1964. Lake Hills was annexed in 1969. By the 1970 census, Bellevue had become the fourth most populous city in the state of Washington, behind only Seattle, Spokane, and Tacoma.

Bellevue remains one of the largest cities in the state, with several high-rise structures in its core and a burgeoning business community. The city experienced a building boom during the mid-2000s, with the building of developments such as Lincoln Square and the Bravern.

Bellevue Square is located in downtown Bellevue and is now one of the largest shopping centers in the region. Opened in 1946, the mall has undergone several significant phases of expansion since the 1980s.

The city's plans include the Bel-Red Corridor Project, a large-scale planning effort to encourage the redevelopment of the large Bel-Red section of the city bordering the adjacent town of Redmond which is a major employment area in the city. Patterned after the redevelopment of the downtown core, plans include superblock mixed-use projects similar to Lincoln Square, premised on private construction and the development of infrastructure such as the extension of Link light rail to the Eastside.

Geography
Bellevue lies between Lake Washington to the west and the smaller Lake Sammamish to the east. Much of Bellevue is drained by the Kelsey Creek watershed, whose source is located in the Larsen Lake and Phantom Lake green belt and whose outlet is near where Interstate 90 meets Lake Washington's eastern shore. The city is bisected by Interstate 405 running north–south, and the southern portion is crossed from west to east by Interstate 90. The State Route 520 freeway roughly delineates the upper reaches of Bellevue.

The city's name is derived from a French term for "beautiful view". Under favorable weather conditions, scenic vistas of the Olympic Mountains and Cascade Mountains can be viewed from hilltops (and strategically positioned high-rise buildings) within the incorporated city.

South of I-90, the city continues up Cougar Mountain, at the top of which is an unincorporated King County location called Hilltop. To the west of Cougar Mountain, Bellevue includes the Coal Creek, Somerset, and Factoria neighborhoods.

Bellevue is bordered by the cities of Kirkland to the north and Redmond to the northeast along the Overlake and Crossroads neighborhoods. Across the short East Channel Bridge, I-90 connects Bellevue to Mercer Island to the southwest. Issaquah is to the east, down I-90 at the south end of Lake Sammamish. The city is bordered to the west by many affluent suburbs such as Medina, Clyde Hill, Hunts Point and Yarrow Point. The south end of Bellevue is bordered by the city of Renton, and to the southeast, the relatively recently incorporated city of Newcastle.

Cityscape

Neighborhoods within Bellevue include Bellecrest, Bel-Red, Bridle Trails, Crossroads, Eastgate/Cougar Mountain, Enatai, Factoria, Lake Hills, Newport, Newport Hills, Northeast Bellevue, Northwest Bellevue, Overlake, Sammamish/East Bellevue, Somerset, Sunset, Tam O'Shanter, West Bellevue, Wilburton, and Woodridge.

Climate

Like much of the Puget Sound lowland, Bellevue has a mild oceanic climate. On average, the hottest month is July, while January is the coldest. However, the city published an analysis of rainfall stating that 2016 saw an usually high  of rainfall, and that rainfall in 2014–2016 was trending unusually high.

Surrounding cities

Transportation
Bellevue is the main Eastside hub for both the local transit authority, King County Metro, and Sound Transit, the regional transit system. The Bellevue Transit Center, which serves both Metro and Sound buses, is located in the heart of the downtown business district and is connected to Interstate 405 by NE 6th St. and a direct-access Texas T HOV ramp. Local buses run into Kirkland, Redmond, Issaquah, Renton, and the University District; regional buses go to Bothell, Lynnwood, Everett, Seattle, Renton, Kent and Auburn, among other cities.

The 2 Line of Sound Transit's Link light rail system is planned to run from Seattle through Mercer Island and Bellevue before ending in Redmond. It was approved by voters on November 4, 2008, as part of the Sound Transit 2 ballot measure. It began construction in 2015 and is scheduled to begin service in 2023.

The Bellevue City Council lobbied hard for Sound Transit—the regional transit authority—to construct its light-rail line underground through Bellevue's rapidly growing downtown. Bellevue promised to devote between $104 million and $150 million toward a potential tunnel in the form of cash, services, free access to rights-of-way and one-time tax revenues that result from the East Link project. In November 2011, the council signed an agreement with Sound Transit. Tunnel construction started in early 2016 while the remainder of downtown Bellevue construction began in mid-2017. Former Bellevue City Council member Claudia Balducci is a member of the Sound Transit board of directors.

The top-down and highly integrated land use and transportation planning is similar to earlier planning for the Downtown.

Bellevue was also served by a railroad, a Burlington Northern branch line known as the Woodinville Subdivision, which included the historic Wilburton Trestle. The line is now disused, though part of the track bed at Wilburton Station will be reused by Sound Transit's light-rail construction. Construction of Eastrail, a rail trail on the abandoned Woodinville Subdivision right of way through Bellevue, is planned to be completed in 2023. Some sections of the railroad in Bellevue were demolished in 2008 to make way for the expansion of I-405 and will require the construction of additional structures to supplement the existing right of way.

The city once had an operating airfield named Bellevue Airfield; it shut down in 1983.

Government and politics

Bellevue has a council-manager form of government with seven non-partisan council members elected at large for staggered four-year terms. The City Council selects a Mayor from among its members (not by popular vote), who serves as council chair for two years but has no veto power. , the mayor is Lynne Robinson and the deputy mayor is Jared Nieuwenhuis. The mayor administrates council meetings, helps set the issues on the council's meeting agendas, and serves as the city's most visible spokesperson. Operational authority is held by the city manager, who administers the city's day-to-day activities. The city manager is also elected by the seven members of the council instead of by popular vote.

Politically, the city leans strongly Democratic, much like the Seattle/King County area as a whole. Of the 61,742 residents who cast ballots in the 2016 U.S. presidential election, 66.11% voted for Hillary Clinton, compared to 24.58% for Donald Trump.

Education

The vast majority of the city is served by the Bellevue School District. There are four main public high schools – Bellevue High School, Interlake High School, Newport High School, and Sammamish High School – as well as two choice lottery high schools, International School and Big Picture School. Newsweek's 2015 ranking of U.S. public high schools placed Interlake at #359 and Newport at #391, with both schools noted for equitably helping low-income students meet average scores on standardized tests.

Portions of Bellevue also lie within the boundaries of Lake Washington School District, Renton School District and Issaquah School District.

At the higher education level the city is home to Bellevue College, part of the Washington Community and Technical Colleges system.

Bellevue is home to Open Window School, an independent school serving gifted students from kindergarten through eighth grade. The Jewish Day School of Metropolitan Seattle is located in Bellevue, serving students from Pre-Kindergarten to Grade 8. At the elementary level, Bellevue is home to several Montessori schools, the Eastside's only Waldorf education at Three Cedars School, as well as Bellevue Christian School. The Seattle Japanese School, a Japanese weekend supplementary school, holds its classes in Bellevue.

Economy

Bellevue is an economic hub of the Seattle region's Eastside and home to the headquarters of various sizes, including the U.S. operations for many international firms. Since 2005, the city has become a hub for software engineering and other technology development centers. These include Expedia, PACCAR Inc, T-Mobile US, Eddie Bauer, SAP Concur, and Symetra. Bellevue hosts a number of satellite offices for large technology companies such as eBay, Oracle, Salesforce, Google, and Microsoft; Microsoft was at one point headquartered in Bellevue but has since moved to the neighboring community of Redmond, Washington. Celebrated video game companies Valve, Bungie, Sucker Punch Productions, and The Pokémon Company are also based here.

In 2019, Amazon and Facebook announced plans to open large engineering centers in Bellevue with plans to add several thousand employees. In 2018, Google also opened a major engineering facility in downtown Bellevue. , there are several high-rise office buildings in Downtown Bellevue that are under construction or in active planning and design phases, including Bellevue 600, part of a major Amazon campus. Several high-rise residential buildings are also planned in downtown, spurred in part by future light rail service, on former retail and low-rise commercial lots.

The city has numerous thriving commercial districts, with four major shopping centers: Bellevue Square in the downtown area, Factoria Mall to the south, Crossroads Mall to the east, and the Overlake Shopping District in the north.

Demographics

As of 2018, one in three Bellevue residents was born outside the United States, most likely due to the prevalence of multinational technology companies in the city. Around 23% of Bellevue's well-educated workforce are in engineering or science-related industries. About half of its residents identify as a person of color or ethnic minority.

According to a 2018 estimate, the median income for a household in the city was $113,698. In a 2020 survey of Centers for Disease Control data, Bellevue was ranked first among small U.S. cities with the highest percentage of physically active adults, with 86 percent reporting that they exercise.

In 2006, Bellevue was rated one of the 25 safest cities in America, based on the per-capita incidence of violent crime.

2010 census
As of the census of 2010, there were 122,363 people, 50,355 households, and 32,145 families residing in the city. The racial makeup of the city was 62.6% White, 2.2% African American, 0.4% Native American, 27.6% Asian, 0.2% Pacific Islander, 3.1% from other races, and 3.9% from two or more races. Hispanic or Latino of any race were 7.0% of the population.

There were 50,355 households, of which 30.0% had children under the age of 18 living with them, 52.9% were married couples living together, 7.6% had a female householder with no husband present, 3.3% had a male householder with no wife present, and 36.2% were non-families. 28.1% of all households were made up of individuals, and 8.4% had someone living alone who was 65 years of age or older. The average household size was 2.41 and the average family size was 2.97.

The median age in the city was 38.5 years. 21.2% of residents were under the age of 18; 7.6% were between the ages of 18 and 24; 30.8% were from 25 to 44; 26.5% were from 45 to 64; and 13.9% were 65 years of age or older. The gender makeup of the city was 50.1% male and 49.9% female.

2000 census
As of the census of 2000, there were 109,569 people, 45,836 households, and 29,060 families residing in the city. The population density was 3,563.6 inhabitants per square mile (1,375.8/km2). There were 48,396 housing units at an average density of 607.7/km2 (1,574.0/mi2). The racial makeup of the city was 74.33% White, 1.99% African American, 0.32% Native American, 17.39% Asian, 0.23% Pacific Islander, 2.54% from other races, and 3.19% from two or more races. Hispanic or Latino of any race were 5.32% of the population.

There were 45,836 households, out of which 27.5% had children under the age of 18 living with them, 53.0% were married couples living together, 7.5% had a female householder with no husband present, and 36.6% were non-families. 28.4% of all households were made up of individuals, and 7.9% had someone living alone who was 65 years of age or older. The average household size was 2.37 and the average family size was 2.93.

In the city, the population was spread out, with 21.1% under the age of 18, 7.8% from 18 to 24, 32.6% from 25 to 44, 25.0% from 45 to 64, and 13.4% who were 65 years of age or older. The median age was 38 years. For every 100 females, there were 98.4 males. For every 100 females age 18 and over, there were 96.6 males.

The median income for a household in the city was $62,338, and the median income for a family was $76,868. Males had a median income of $56,456 versus $37,124 for females. The per capita income for the city was $36,905. About 3.8% of families and 5.7% of the population were below the poverty line, including 5.7% of those under age 18 and 6.3% of those age 65 or over.

Arts and culture

Cultural events
Bellevue is the site of the annual Bellevue Arts and Crafts Fair (originally Pacific Northwest Arts and Crafts Fair), held since 1947 during the last weekend in July. The biennial Bellevue Sculpture Exhibition draws thousands of visitors to the Downtown Park to view up to 46 three-dimensional artworks from artists around the country. In celebration of its strawberry farming history, Bellevue holds an annual Strawberry Festival on the fourth weekend in June at Crossroads Park. The festival initially began in 1925, and continued to 1942 when many Bellevue's strawberry farmers were incarcerated as part of the Japanese Internment. In 1987 the festival was resumed as a one evening event, and in 2003 it was expanded back to a multi-day festival.

Places of interest

The Bellevue Arts Museum first opened in 1975, then moved to Bellevue Square in 1983. In 2001, the museum moved into its own building, designed by Steven Holl. The museum subsequently ran into financial difficulties and was closed to the public in 2003. After a lengthy fundraising campaign, a remodel, and a new mission to become a national center for the fine art of craft and design, the museum reopened on June 18, 2005 with an exhibition of teapots. The Rosalie Whyel Museum of Doll Art - now closed - contained one of the largest doll collections in the world—more than a thousand dolls—displayed on two floors of a Victorian-style building, which is now the site of the KidsQuest Children's Museum. Near Interstate 405 is Meydenbauer Center, a convention center that brings corporate meetings and charity events to the downtown area. Meydenbauer also includes a 410-seat theater which attracts operas, ballets, and orchestral performances.

The city government has planned to build a performing arts center, tentatively named the Tateuchi Center (named for philanthropist Ina Tateuchi), since the 1980s. It would include a 2,000-seat concert hall, offices, and creative spaces at a site in Downtown Bellevue. The $200 million project is partially funded with private donations and grants from the city and county governments.

Sports and recreation
Since the 1970s, the city has taken an active role in ensuring that its commercial development does not overwhelm its natural land and water resources. More than 5,500 Bellevue residents participate in volunteer activities through this department annually.

Bellevue was home to the American Basketball Association team, the Bellevue Blackhawks. The Blackhawks in 2005, despite being ranked 13th in the league, made it to the championship game in front of 15,000 fans in Little Rock, Arkansas. The team has been inactive since 2006.

The city has a small baseball stadium, Bannerwood Park, that has a listed capacity of 700 spectators. The Seattle Redhawks of the Western Athletic Conference, an NCAA Division I baseball team, have played their home games in Bellevue since 2010.

Notable people

William S. Ayer, former president and CEO of Alaska Airlines
Ricky Horror, guitarist and backing vocalist of Motionless in White
Peter Horton, actor
James Love, Director, Knowledge Ecology International
Rob McKenna, former Attorney General of Washington
Satya Nadella, CEO of Microsoft
Gabe Newell, owner of Valve
Timothy Omundson, actor
Layne Staley, former lead singer of Alice in Chains
Ann Reinking, Broadway actress, dancer and choreographer
Larry Sanger, Wikipedia co-founder
Ann Wilson, co-founder of Heart
Nancy Wilson, co-founder of Heart

Athletes, coaches, and sportscasters
Budda Baker, professional football player, safety for Arizona Cardinals
Michael Brantley, Major League Baseball (MLB) outfielder for the Houston Astros
Matthew Boyd, MLB player, pitcher for the Seattle Mariners
Matt Hague, former MLB first baseman who is currently a minor league hitting coach for the Toronto Blue Jays
Tim Lincecum, former MLB pitcher
Fredy Montero, MLS player for Seattle Sounders FC
Dave Niehaus, former broadcaster for California Angels and Seattle Mariners, recipient of the Ford C. Frick Award
John Olerud, former MLB player for Toronto Blue Jays, Seattle Mariners
Detlef Schrempf, former All-Star NBA player for Seattle SuperSonics
Matthew Sheldon, professional soccer player for the Charleston Battery
Robert Stock, MLB player
Chuck Swirsky, NBA broadcaster for Chicago Bulls, Toronto Raptors
Matt Tuiasosopo, former professional baseball player and the current manager of the Gwinnett Stripers

Sister cities
Bellevue has the following sister cities:

 Hualien, Taiwan
 Yao, Osaka Prefecture, Japan
 Kladno, Czech Republic
 Liepāja, Latvia

See also
 Gontmakher Mansion
 Lakemont, Washington

References

External links

 Official site

 Government Trade and Technology Official Site
 Visitors bureau site
Community information site

 
Cities in Washington (state)
Cities in King County, Washington
Cities in the Seattle metropolitan area
Populated places established in 1869
1869 establishments in Washington Territory